Arnulf of Orléans may refer to:

Arnulf (bishop of Orléans), bishop from 970 until 1003
Arnulf of Orléans (12th century), Latinist and poet